Zhang Jiankang (born 25 August 1998) is a Chinese professional snooker player. He was suspended from the professional tour in January 2023 as part of a match-fixing investigation involving ten Chinese players. He was subsequently charged with fixing a match, failing to report approaches for him to fix matches, and betting on snooker.

Career
Zhang started to play aged 8, influenced by his father, who was a club-level player. He had seen Ding Junhui playing on television, and expressed an interest. At the age of 11, Zhang left mainstream school and went alone to Shenzhen and later Shanghai, where he was coached by Wu Wenzhong who had previously coached Ding Junhui. In 2014 Zhang won the Sichuan Provincial Championship and the Chinese U21 Championship, and was accepted in the CBSA Academy in Beijing.

Early career
Following Zhang's promising performances in the academy and in Chinese tour events, the CBSA awarded him a wildcard for the 2016 International Championship in Daqing. There he defeated Ross Muir 6-3 before losing to Stuart Bingham 6–1.

At the 2017 IBSF U-21 Championship he missed the final red attempting a maximum break against Jackson Page. He lost in the semi-finals to eventual winner Fan Zhengyi.

In April 2018 he was awarded a two-year professional tour card, being ranked at the highest amateur in the CBSA China Tour ranking list. Ahead of the 2018–19 season he has been announced as being based at Q House Snooker Academy in Darlington as a resident professional, managed by Chusak Phetmalaikul.

2018/2019
He competed at the 2018 World Snooker Team Cup representing China with Fan Zhengyi but they lost to India 2–3 in the Round of 16.

Zhang's first win as a professional was against Michael Holt in the European Masters. Unfortunately, a lost ID card meant he was unable to travel to the UK to compete in the World Championship. He finished his first season ranked 113.

2019/2020
At the start of the 2019–20 season, Zhang was again affected by travel problems, missing the first two tournaments. He then went on a losing run of 5 matches. At the Scottish Open he produced his best performance to date, beating Chen Feilong, John Astley and Tom Ford to reach the last-16, where he lost to Scott Donaldson. In the Welsh Open he lost 4–1 in the first round to 5-times World Champion Ronnie O'Sullivan.

With the outbreak of COVID-19, Zhang sought to return to China on 29 March. His journey included quarantines in both Shanghai and his hometown Yibin, after an internal flight. He finally reached home after almost 1 month of travelling, spent mostly in isolation hotels. On 28 June it was announced that he would not be returning to the UK for the World Championship, which had been rescheduled for July. This confirmed his relegation from the tour, being ranked outside the top 64.

2020/2021
The 2020–21 season was severely disrupted by the COVID-19 pandemic. The first snooker tournament to be staged was a teams event in Lanzhou in November 2020. Zhang Jiankang played for the Sichuan team, but they lost in the last-16 to the Jilin team. In April 2021, there were two tournaments in Beijing to determine 4 qualifiers for the World Professional Tour for the 2021–22 season. With wins over Wi Ning, Lin Hui, Fang Xiongman, Ju Reti and Deng Haohui, Zhang successfully progressed from the first event, losing only 4 frames in his six matches.

The CBSA subsequently arranged a tournament in Xi'an, where Zhang Jiankang reached the semi-final, losing to eventual winner Zhang Anda. He also recorded the highest break of 134.

In June, the China City teams event was staged, also in Xi'an. Most of the top players in China participated in the 35-team event, including 15 professionals. Zhang Jiankang played for the Sichuan team, alongside Zhou Yuelong and Cai Wei. Zhang scored the first century break in the competition, 115 against Dalian. Sichuan topped their group, and proceeded to the knockout phase. In the Q-final Zhang won a tense deciding frame against Cao Yupeng of Suzhou, the tournament favourites. But ultimately Sichuan lost 4–2 in the final to Shanghai, whose players were Tian Pengfei, Lu Ning and Zhao Jianbo.

2021/2022
In June, Zhang Jiankang returned to the UK as a professional, accompanied by his father. He beat Martin O'Donnell in the Summer Championship League, but ultimately finished 3rd in the 4-player group. In the British Open, he defeated Peter Lines, Li Hang and Pang Junxu to reach the last-16. There he faced Mark Williams, but lost 3-2 after missing several chances to win. In the next 9 tournaments, he could only manage one win, against Joe Perry. However, in the World Championship he beat John Astley 6-4 and Sunny Akani 6-4 (after having led 5–0) before losing to Stephen Maguire 6–3. This was his first World Championship after missing two previous events with travel problems. Zhang finished the season ranked 95.

Performance and rankings timeline

References

External links

Zhang Jiankang at worldsnooker.com

1998 births
Living people
Chinese snooker players
People from Yibin
Sportspeople from Sichuan
21st-century Chinese people